The Gogo Formation in the Kimberley region of Western Australia is a Lagerstätte that exhibits exceptional preservation of a Devonian reef community. The formation is named after Gogo Station, a cattle station where outcrops appear and fossils are often collected from, as is nearby Fossil Downs Station.

History 
The reef, which now stands up abruptly in the western Australian desert (as the Windjana Limestone), was first identified in 1940 by paleontologist Curt Teichert, who discovered the first fossil fish from the region.

Sedimentology 
Unweathered sections of the Gogo Formation are made of siltstone, shale and calcarenite with numerous limestone concretions. These concretions are resistant to weathering, producing extensive nodule fields on the ground in areas where the surrounding rock has eroded away.

The Gogo sediments represent deep, hypoxic seafloor deposits in the vicinity of a large tropical reef composed primarily of algae and stromatoporoids during the Frasnian faunal stage of the Late Devonian. Associated stratigraphic units which comprise this ancient reef system are the Windjana Formation (the actual reef structures), Pillara Limestone (reef platform) and the Sadler Formation (fore-reef deposits).

Deposition 
The formation was deposited in the Frasnian (late Devonian).

Fossil preservation 
The fossils of the Gogo Formation display three-dimensional soft-tissue preservation of tissues as fragile as nerves and embryos with umbilical cords. Over fifty species of fish have been described from the formation, and arthropods, including phyllocarids and eurypterids are similarly well-preserved. Nautiloids, goniatites and tentaculids are also known from the formation, but their soft tissue is not preserved.

The calcareous concretions formed around objects from the shallow reef areas which sank into the deep anoxic basins. The concretions sometimes contain the remains of fish, whose bodies are often preserved complete in three-dimensions due to rapid encasement and the slow rate of decay in the oxygen-poor surroundings. By repeated baths in a dilute acid solution, the matrix is dissolved away via a process of acid etching to reveal delicate fish fossils, some retaining impressions of soft tissues.

The discovery of Materpiscis, a placoderm preserved with an embryonic juvenile still attached by its umbilical cord, has revealed that at least some placoderms gave birth to live young.

Fossil content

Placodermi

Actinopterygii

Chondrichthyes

Acanthodians

Sarcopterygii

Conodonta

Ammonoidea

Arthropoda 

 Corals

References 

Geologic formations of Australia
Devonian System of Australia
Devonian southern paleotropical deposits
Frasnian Stage
Limestone formations
Shale formations
Reef deposits
Devonian southern paleotemperate deposits
Lagerstätten
Fossiliferous stratigraphic units of Oceania
Paleontology in Australia
Geology of Western Australia